The history of Canadian animation involves a considerable element of the realities of a country neighbouring the United States and both competitiveness and co-operation across the border.

History

1910s-1950s
Canadians contributed greatly to the technologies and practices used to create animated television shows, movies and special effects. Starting in 1912, Canadian born cartoonist and painter Raoul Barré introduced standard perforations in the drawing paper and "peg bars" to hold them in place which eliminated jerkiness when going from one image to the next. He also introduced the slash system, a method of drawing the background only once (instead of with each frame as had been done previously) on a separate sheet, leaving blank spaces for character movement. In 1913, Barre organized a systematic method of producing animated cartoons in an assembly line fashion. The assembly line method is essentially how all commercial animations (television, film etc.) are created to this day.

In 1919, Jack (J.A.) Norling produced The Man Who Woke Up, the oldest surviving animation made in Canada.

Prior to 1939, animation production was a very low scale with small production that were often discouraged by theatre chains like Famous Players. Such companies did not want Canadian competition to their parent companies' product. However, independent animators such as Jack (J.A). Norling in Winnipeg, Jean Arsin and Charles Lambly in Montreal, and Harold Peberdy, Bert Cob, Walter H. Swaffield and Bryant Fryer in Toronto, were able to produce short animations, primarily for advertising and educational purposes.

1939 saw the establishment of the National Film Board of Canada, which provided a strong government supported organization for the creation of distinctively Canadian work.  Animation was essentially an afterthought, but an initial and short-lived period of co-production with the Walt Disney Company in the making of animated propaganda films helped establish a core of animators who continued production after Disney withdrew.

Initially, the artistic focus of the crew was to explore types of animation apart from regular cel animation since it was decided competing with the American companies in this field was counterproductive.  With that approach, luminaries like Norman McLaren made their mark with innovative work in forms like drawn on film animation. In addition, the agency eventually gained the confidence to produce cel animation as well.

1960s
Apart from the National Film Board, Canadian production in the commercial sphere was largely as limited as before.  The biggest contribution in the 1960s and much of the 1970s was in the field of voice acting with many major television productions like Rudolph the Red-Nosed Reindeer and Spider-Man sporting Canadian voice actors like Paul Soles and Paul Kligman. Some of the animation for these features were sub-contracted by such Canadian studios as Crawley Films in Ottawa and The Guest Group in Toronto, a group of creative companies owned and run by Al Guest.

The situation began to change in the late 1960s with Rocket Robin Hood, which was produced by Al Guest.

1970s-1980s
In the 1970s, independent companies were formed to produce low budget children's programming.  Some examples are The Undersea Adventures of Captain Nemo, and The Toothbrush Family as well as Ukaliq and The Sunrunners all written, produced and directed by Al Guest and his partner Jean Mathieson at their Toronto company Rainbow Animation.

Longer term successes began with the establishment of the Canadian animation studio Nelvana Limited in 1971. Before they were huge, they mainly did the production for live-action/animated shorts. These were known as Small Star Cinema, in production from 1974 until 1975. Nelvana took advantage of the new Canadian content broadcast rules to produce a successful series of acclaimed TV specials. They also had some success in the United States, working on productions like the animated segment of Star Wars Holiday Special in 1978.  However, the confidence arising from this success led to the company into an ill-advised and troubled production of a feature film, Rock & Rule which proved a crippling box office bomb (though it later became a cult classic).  Because of the failure of Rock & Rule, Nelvana almost shut down operations and would file for bankruptcy. To save themselves from shutting down, the company turned to television animation work which proved successful with series like Inspector Gadget and Care Bears. The company eventually became a prime supplier of animation work into the American network TV market throughout the 1990s.

Two new players suddenly appeared in Ottawa, with Atkinson Film-Arts producing TV specials based on the Jean De Brunhoff Babar books and the Lynn Johnston comic strip For Better or For Worse, as well as the series The Adventures of Teddy Ruxpin, Dennis The Menace, and animation for the film Heavy Metal and the specials and subsequent series of Kevin Gillis' popular The Raccoons. Disputes between Atkinson management and the Raccoons producers led Gillis' Raccoons production partner Sheldon Wiseman to form a new Ottawa studio, Hinton Animation Studios. Hinton took over animation for The Raccoons, and produced animation for projects under Wiseman's own Lacewood Productions. When the studio's feature film The Nutcracker Prince performed poorly at the box office, Hinton found itself unable to pay off the money it borrowed to finance the feature; the situation was further exacerbated by creative tensions between Gillis and Wiseman. Due to these problems, Hinton dissolved in 1990, bringing an end to The Raccoons and Gillis and Wiseman's partnership the following year. Wiseman subsequently reorganized the Hinton animation staff as Lacewood Studios, which produced a new series of For Better or For Worse specials, and co-produced several television series with producers in the United States and France.

In the 1980s the animation department of the French division of the CBC in Montreal took centre stage by winning two Oscars for its animation shorts:  Crac in 1981 and The Man Who Planted Trees in 1987. Both were produced by Frédéric Back. In about the same period private and public colleges started offering complete animation programs.  In 1984 Sheridan College of Oakville won an Oscar for Charade, by one of its graduating students, Jon Minnis.

Notable NFB shorts during this era included The Street (1976), The Big Snit (1985) and The Cat Came Back (1988).

1990s-2000s
With the renaissance of animation in the 1990s, Canadian animation further prospered with conventional fare from companies like Nelvana and Cinar while innovative work from Mainframe Entertainment such the first computer animated series, ReBoot drew considerable success on its own. The demand for animators during this time (and also during the slow period of the 1980s) caused a global search for excellent and skilled animators causing many talented Canadians to wander the globe to fill the demand. Many Canadians can be found worldwide in prominent positions in animation companies throughout the world. From Richard Williams directing animation on the Oscar-winning Who Framed Roger Rabbit in the late 1980s in England (while also working on his unfinished film The Thief and the Cobbler there as well) to others directing creating and supervising animation in television and commercial studios around the world including many prominent video games such as Halo 2, Rayman and Star Wars: Knights of the Old Republic.

In 1997, Teletoon (along with its French-language counterpart Télétoon) was established as Canada's first dedicated animation television channel whose broadcast licence agreement stipulated at least one original animated television series a season.

Companies such as Montreal's Toon Boom and Toronto's Alias Research/Wavefront Technologies and Side Effects Software have not only helped to define international technical standards, but have assumed a leadership role within the computer software industry. Toon Boom's "Harmony", Alias/Wavefront's "Maya"  and Side Effects Software's "Houdini" are leading animation software packages used in many animated features and special effects. From shows as simple as The Simpsons (Harmony), South Park (Maya) and Angela Anaconda (Houdini) to special effects as fantastic and complex as those seen in the Harry Potter films (both software packages) and more.

Also, animated Flash cartoons originally started as web programs began making their way to television such as March Entertainment's Chilly Beach (2003-2006), on the CBC, and Smiley Guy Studios' Odd Job Jack (2003-2007), on the Comedy Network. The former franchise was also expanded two include two full films. In a similar vein, the CGI animated science fiction comedy show Tripping the Rift aired between 2004 and 2007. This also signalled the adoption of animation more aimed at adults pioneered in the United States by The Simpsons and speciality blocks such as Adult Swim. Teletoon entered this market in September 2002 with its Teletoon at Night programming block and original programming, most notably with its adult sitcom Fugget About It (2012–2016) and Doomsday Brothers (2020). G4 also launched its own Adult Digital Distraction on June 9, 2009, before being shut down by the CRTC in late 2011 for violating the station's mandate; the block returned again in 2012. Adult Swim later came to Canada itself on July 4, 2012. The late-night Bionix block aired on YTV from September 10, 2004 to February 7, 2010, airing content aimed at an older audience than usual, including Japanese anime.

Further experimentation and exploration in the art of animation which began with the National Film Board of Canada and the works of Norman Mclaren has continued through the decades through the techniques and films of other NFB animators such as Jacques Drouin, Chris Hinton (Blackfly), Wendy Tilby and Amanda Forbis (When the Day Breaks), Janet Perlman and many others. A few Independent organizations such as the Toronto Animated Image Society in Toronto and especially the Quickdraw Animation Society in Calgary have also formed and continue to contribute, explore the art of animation and produce new works by emerging and established Canadian animators and artists. This exploration and blending of assorted and unusual techniques can be seen in the many boutique animation companies and independent animators that have sprung up throughout Canada and has continued to propel Canada's reputation of interesting and innovative animation techniques.

The Ottawa International Animation Festival which takes place every fall in Ottawa Ontario is one of the largest and most respected animation festivals for drawing professional, commercial, independent and amateur animators and animation enthusiasts alike from all over the world.  It is sponsored by the Association internationale du film d'animation, better known as ASIFA with chapters throughout the world.

2010s
In August 2011, NFB Animation Studio executive producer David Verrall retired, after more than 34 years at the NFB including 14 years as head of its English-language animation unit. Verrall produced or executive produced 240 NFB animated films, such as Bob's Birthday, Ryan and The Danish Poet with each winning Academy Awards. He was succeeded by Roddy McManus.

Filipino/Canadian animator Dominic Panganiban started a YouTube channel in August 2012 that as of November 2018 has over 800 million views and 6 million subscribers, ranking him in the 658th place for most subscribed. The channel generally posts videos Domics animates in which he tells a story about his life, an aspect of it, or his thoughts.

In 2014, Canadian animation studio ToonBox Entertainment created the Canadian-South Korean co-production The Nut Job, directed by Peter Lepeniotis and starring Will Arnett. While it garnered negative reviews, it was one of the highest-budgeted and highest-grossing Canadian films of all time, with a cost of $42 million and a worldwide gross of $107 million as of September 2014.

On October 26, 2016, American media company Frederator Networks, Inc. (of The Fairly OddParents and Adventure Time) created a merger with Canadian animation studio Rainmaker Entertainment (of ReBoot and Beast Wars: Transformers) and Ezrin Hirsh, Inc. (partners are producers Bob Ezrin and Michael Hirsh of Nelvana) to form Wow Unlimited Media.

A 13-episode animated series based on the hit live action Canadian sitcom Corner Gas (2004-2009)  was announced on December 19, 2016. The series features the voices of many of the original series' cast members, except for Janet Wright who died in 2016. It was scheduled to début in 2017 on the Comedy Network, but was ultimately delayed until April 2, 2018 under the official title of Corner Gas Animated. Its first episode, "Dry Bones", was the highest rated première in the history of the Comedy Network.

Further reading
Karen Mazurkewich, Cartoon Capers: The History of Canadian Animators. Toronto: McArthur & Company, 1999.

See also

Canadian animators
History of animation
History of Canada
Cinema of Canada
Independent animation

References

External links
Animation at the National Film Board of Canada.

 
Canadian
Animation
National Film Board of Canada